The Turkmen Air Force is the air force branch of the Armed Forces of Turkmenistan. It was formed from former Soviet Air Forces units within that region of the Turkestan Military District. The Turkmen Air Force inherited some 300 Soviet aircraft, and has pilots trained in Ukraine.

History 
After the division of the Turkestan Military District of the Soviet Armed Forces between the independent states of Central Asia, Turkmenistan inherited the largest aviation group in Central Asia, deployed at two large bases: one near Mary and one near Ashgabat. In the 1990s, the Turkmen Air Force took over operation of Krasnovodsk Air Base (now Turkmenbashi International Airport), which was an interceptor aircraft facility for the Soviet Air Force. Among the former units of the Soviet Air Forces in Turkmenistan were the following: 67th Mixed Aviation Regiment, 366th Independent Helicopter Squadron, 179th Fighter Aviation Regiment, 217th Fighter/Bomber Aviation Regiment. In 2002, the Air Force was armed with up to 250 helicopters and aircraft of various systems. There were plans to strengthen the coastal naval force in 2015, which resulted in a moderate improvement in the Caspian Sea presence.

Organization 
99th Aviation Base (Mary-2 airbase) with MiG-29 and Su-25.
47th Separate Mixed Aviation Squadron (Аk-Tepe/Ashkabad) with Аn-26/24, Mi-24 and Mi-8.
107th Fighter Aviation Regiment (Ak-Tepe) with 38 MiG-23 and 20 MiG-25 (not operational).
31st Separate Aviation Squadron (Chardzhou/Turkmenabad) with MiG-21, Su-7, L-39, Yak-28 and Аn-12 (not operational).
55th Fighter Aviation Regiment (Balkanabat) with MiG-23М (not operational).
56th Storage Base (Kyzyl-Arvat) with MiG-23.
1st Anti-Aircraft Missile Regiment 'Turkmenbashi' (Bikrova/Ashkabad) with 2K11 Krug
2nd Radio-Technical Brigade

Akdepe Airdrome 
Akdepe Airdrome is the main airfield of the air force, located in Ashgabat. The border troops of Turkmenistan use the airfield for their own aircraft. In June 2008, President of Turkmenistan Gurbanguly Berdimuhammedov flew over the capital of the country on a MiG-29 supersonic combat aircraft after visiting the airfield.

Around 2015, conditions for local flights at the military airfield began to be prepared for the 2017 Asian Indoor and Martial Arts Games.

Mary-2 Airfield 
Mary-2 airbase is located north of the city of Mary. In the Soviet era, it hosted two Tu-22M3 squadrons from the 185th Guards Heavy Bomber Aviation Regiment. During the withdrawal of Soviet troops from Afghanistan, these two squadrons bombed the Afghan Mujahideen during the Panjshir offensives of the Soviet 40th Army. In early 1989, the last of these squadrons left the Mary-2 airfield and returned to their places of permanent deployment. The long runway Mary-2 can accommodate all types of aircraft, including heavy transport aircraft and strategic bombers. During the Iraq War, it was speculated that the airbase would be used to host United States Army equipment from the Karshi-Khanabad Air Base in neighboring Uzbekistan. In September 2004, a representative of the military attaché of the U.S. visited the Mary-2 airfield, and at around the same time, construction companies from the United Arab Emirates began work at the airfield to bring the facility to a state of full readiness for operation.

Aircraft
The IISS in 2012 said the Air Force had 3,000 personnel with 94 combat capable aircraft.

The total number of aircraft is 74It said there were two fighter/ground attack squadrons with MiG-29/MiG-29UB (total of 24 both types), Sukhoi Su-17 Fitter-Bs (65) and two Sukhoi Su-25 Frogfoots (with 41 more being refurbished). It reported one transport squadron with Antonov An-26 'Curl' (1), and Mi-8s and Mi-24s (8 and 10 listed in service respectively). Training units had Sukhoi Su-7 Fitter-As (3 listed in service) and L-39 Albatros. Air defence missile units had SA-2, SA-3, and SA-5.

Current inventory

Commanders 

 Lieutenant General Serdar Charyyarov (1994–2002)
 Colonel Gurbanguly Gurbangulyyev (2004–2010)

References

Military of Turkmenistan
Air forces by country